TW Hydrae is a T Tauri star approximately 196 light-years away in the constellation of Hydra (the Sea Serpent). TW Hydrae is about 80% of the mass of the Sun, but is only about 5-10 million years old. The star appears to be accreting from a face-on protoplanetary disk of dust and gas, which has been resolved in images from the ALMA observatory. TW Hydrae is accompanied by about twenty other low-mass stars with similar ages and spatial motions, comprising the "TW Hydrae association" or TWA, one of the closest regions of recent "fossil" star-formation to the Sun.

Stellar characteristics

TW Hydrae is a pre-main-sequence star that is approximately 80% the mass of and 111% the radius of the Sun. It has a temperature of 4000 K and is about 8 million years old. In comparison, the Sun is about 4.6 billion years old and has a temperature of 5778 K. The star's luminosity is 28% (0.28x) that of the Sun, equivalent to that of a main-sequence star of spectral type ~K2. However, the spectral class is K6.

The star's apparent magnitude, or how bright it appears from Earth's perspective, is 11.27. It is too dim to be seen with the naked eye.

Planetary system

The star is known to host one likely exoplanet, TW Hydrae b.

Protoplanetary disk

Previously disproven protoplanet
In December 2007, a team led by Johny Setiawan of the Max Planck Institute for Astronomy in Heidelberg, Germany announced discovery of a planet orbiting TW Hydrae, dubbed "TW Hydrae b" with a minimum mass around 1.2 Jupiter masses, a period of 3.56 days, and an orbital radius of 0.04 astronomical units (inside the inner rim of the protoplanetary disk). Assuming it orbits in the same plane as the outer part of the dust disk (inclination 7±1°), it has a true mass of 9.8±3.3 Jupiter masses. However, if the inclination is similar to the inner part of the dust disk (4.3±1.0°), the mass would be 16 Jupiter masses, making it a brown dwarf. Since the star itself is so young, it was presumed this is the youngest extrasolar planet yet discovered, and essentially still in formation.

In 2008 a team of Spanish researchers concluded that the planet does not exist: the radial velocity variations were not consistent when observed at different wavelengths, which would not occur if the origin of the radial velocity variations was caused by an orbiting planet. Instead, the data was better modelled by starspots on TW Hydrae's surface passing in and out of view as the star rotates. "Results support the spot scenario rather than the presence of a hot Jupiter around TW Hya". Similar wavelength-dependent radial velocity variations, also caused by starspots, have been detected on other T Tauri stars.

New study of more distant planet
In 2016, ALMA found evidence that a possible Neptune-like planet was forming in its disk, at a distance of around 22 AU.

Detection of methanol
In 2016, methanol, one of the building blocks for life, was detected in the star's protoplanetary disk.

Gallery

Notes

References

External links

 
 

Hydra (constellation)
K-type main-sequence stars
T Tauri stars
Circumstellar disks
TW Hydrae association
Hydrae, TW
Durchmusterung objects
053911
Hypothetical planetary systems